Commodity production may refer to:
Production of commodities
Capitalist mode of production (Marxist theory)
Simple commodity production
Socialist mode of production